Chrysops viduatus  is a species of 'horse flies' belonging to the family Tabanidae.

It is a Palearctic species with a limited distribution in Europe

Description
The middle tibiae of  C. viduatus are distinctly yellow-brown. The second abdominal segment is yellow with a well-defined quadrate black spot.

Biology
Chrysops viduatus occurs in wet meadows, mires, fens and wet woodlands. The larvae feed on organic matter in wet peaty detritus. Adults feed on large mammals including cattle, horses and deer.

References

External links
Influential points

Tabanidae
Insects described in 1794
Taxa named by Johan Christian Fabricius
Diptera of Europe